Wave Sound is an electronic music festival held on the beach of Bogliasco, 11 kilometers southeast of Genova, and has been organized since 2009.

See also

List of electronic music festivals
Live electronic music

References

External links

Electronic music festivals in Italy
Music festivals established in 2009